Selma Gubin (1903 – 17 June 1974) was a Russian Empire-born American artist. Her work is included in the collections of the Smithsonian American Art Museum, the Harvard Art Museums and the Hood Museum of Art.

References

1903 births
1974 deaths
20th-century American women artists
Emigrants from the Russian Empire to the United States